The 1962–63 Rugby Union County Championship was the 63rd edition of England's premier rugby union club competition at the time.

Warwickshire won the competition for the sixth time (and fifth time in six years) after defeating Yorkshire in the final.

Final

See also
 English rugby union system
 Rugby union in England

References

Rugby Union County Championship
County Championship (rugby union) seasons